The 2002 French Figure Skating Championships took place between 7 and 9 December 2001 in Grenoble. Skaters competed at the senior level in the disciplines of men's singles, women's singles, pair skating, and ice dancing. The event was used to help determine the French team to the 2002 Winter Olympics, the 2002 World Championships, and the 2002 European Championships.

Results

Men

Ladies

Pairs

Ice dancing

External links
 results

French Figure Skating Championships, 2002
French Figure Skating Championships, 2002
French Figure Skating Championships
French Figure Skating Championships, 2002
|French Figure Skating Championships]]
French Figure Skating Championships